
Year 201 BC was a year of the pre-Julian Roman calendar. At the time it was known as the Year of the Consulship of Lentulus and Paetus (or, less frequently, year 553 Ab urbe condita). The denomination 201 BC for this year has been used since the early medieval period, when the Anno Domini calendar era became the prevalent method in Europe for naming years.

Events 
 By place 

 Carthage 
 On Hannibal's advice, Carthage sues for peace with the Romans, ending the Second Punic War. Carthage is reduced to a client state of Rome. In the peace treaty between Carthage and Rome, Carthage surrenders all her Mediterranean possessions to Rome, including her Iberian territories. The Carthaginians agree to pay Rome 200 talents per year for 50 years, allow Masinissa to rule Numidia as an independent kingdom, make no war without Rome's permission, and destroy all but 10 of the Carthaginian warships.
 Following the conclusion of the peace with Rome, Hannibal is elected as suffet, or chief magistrate, of Carthage. The office has over the years become insignificant in Carthaginian politics, but Hannibal restores its power and authority. He sets out to reform the administration and finances of Carthage and reduce the power of the oligarchy which has ruled Carthage before and during the Second Punic War.

 Roman Republic 
 The Romans oust the Carthaginians from Malta.
 In Rome, according to the Roman historian Livy, land is distributed to veterans of the Second Punic War. This is the first documented instance of a practice that later becomes commonplace.

 Greece 
 Philip V of Macedon captures Samos and the Egyptian fleet stationed there. He then besieges Chios to the north.
 Rhodes and its allies Pergamum, Cyzicus, and Byzantium combine their fleets and defeat Philip V in the Battle of Chios. His flagship is trapped and rammed by two enemy ships. 
 The Spartan king, Nabis, once more invades and captures Messene. However, the Spartans are forced to retreat when the Achaean League army of Philopoemen intervenes. Nabis' forces are decisively defeated at Tegea by Philopoemen and Nabis is forced to check his expansionist ambitions for the time being.

 China 
 The construction of Nanchang begins.
 King Xin of Han, in alliance with Modu Chanyu of the Xiongnu, launches a rebellion against the Han Dynasty in the Taiyuan Commandery. He is defeated by Emperor Gaozu of Han and his generals, who chase Xin of Han into Xiongnu territory.

Deaths 
 Gnaeus Naevius, Latin epic poet and dramatist, who has written historical plays (fabulae praetextae) that are based on Roman historical or legendary figures and events (b. c. 264 BC)
 Zhongli Mo, Chinese general during the Chu–Han Contention

References